Review Board is a web-based collaborative code review tool, available as free software under the MIT License.

An alternative to Rietveld and Gerrit, Review Board integrates with Bazaar, ClearCase, CVS, Git, Mercurial, Perforce, and Subversion.

Review Board can be installed on any server running Apache or lighttpd and is free for both personal and commercial use.

There is also an official commercial Review Board hosting service, RBCommons.

Review requests can be posted manually or automatically using either a REST Web API, or a Python script.

Users 
Some of the notable users of Review Board are:

Cisco
Citrix
Novell
NetApp
Twitter
VMware
Yelp
Yahoo
LinkedIn

Apache Software Foundation
HBase
Calligra
Konsole
Amazon
Cloudera
Hewlett Packard Enterprise
Tableau Software

See also 
List of tools for code review

References

External links
 
 
 Review Board all-in-one installer
 RBCommons Review Board hosting

Software review
Free software programmed in Python
Software using the MIT license